Savitri Devi College & Hospital is an Indian drama television series, that was aired for 365 episodes from 15 May 2017 to 29 September 2018. Produced by Rashmi Sharma, it starred Swarda Thigale, Varun Kapoor and Vikram Sakhalkar.

In 2019, it was re-aired on Rishtey as Mere Dil Ki Lifeline.

Plot 
The show revolves around the life of Dr. Saanchi Mishra, a young medical student who aspires to become a successful doctor and joins the prestigious Savitri Devi College & Hospital in pursuit of her dream. Saanchi comes from a middle-class family having been brought up by her mother Jaya who has a secret past with the owner of Savitri Devi Hospital, the famous Dr. Anand Malhotra. Jaya's deceased husband Dr. Sunil Mishra and Anand were business partners. Savitri Devi College and Hospital is built on Sunil's land.The show also features the lives of Dr. Anand Malhotra and his family including his son Dr. Veer and daughter Priya and his second wife Gayatri and her daughter Dr. Riya and Anand's younger brother Adarsh and his wife Neeta. Savitri Devi College and Hospital is named after Anand's deceased wife Savitri who is Jaya's best friend. Later Saachi gets admission as an intern in Savitri Devi College and Hospital with her best friends Dr. Isha Negi and Dr. Pragya Yadav.

Dr. Veer and Dr. Riya are also interns in same hospital. Saachi learns of Mishra family's past with Savitri Devi College and Hospital. Savitri is revealed to be alive and is in same hospital. Anand had hidden Savitri in a room. Saachi finds out that Savitri is alive and guides Veer to that room. Savitri was comatose for fifteen years. Savitri met with an accident 15 years before. Soon Savitri wakes up from coma and returns to Malhotra family. She knows Anand's secret. Veer and Saachi fall in love with each other and get married.

A witch Nayantara hauntes Malhotra family so she can exact revenge on Anand. Years ago a pregnant woman (Nayantara) came to Savitri Devi Hospital for delivery. But she didn't get the care and treatment she needs, so her baby is stillborn. Nayantara died from the shock and Anand buried Nayantara's body in the same ward. Saanchi managed to free Riya whom Nayantara had possessed and saved the family. The serial ends with the Malhotra's turning ward 13 (which was the ward Nayantara died) into "Nayantara pediatric ward" in remembrance of Nayantara and her child.

Cast

Main
Swarda Thigale as Dr. Saachi Malhotra: Dean of Savitri Devi College & Hospital; Jaya and Sunil's daughter; Sunny's elder sister; Pragya and Isha's friend; Kabir's former wife; Veer's wife (2017–18)
Varun Kapoor as Dr. Veer Malhotra: Savitri and Anand's son; Priya's younger brother; Riya's half-brother; Aniket and Garv's friend; Mishri's former husband; Saachi's husband (2017–18)
Vikram Sakhalkar as Dr. Kabir Kapoor: Kusum and Kailash's son; Saachi's former husband; Riya's husband (2017–18)

Recurring
Arshi Khan as Nayantara: Witch (2018)
Shilpa Shirodkar as Jaya Bajpai: Sunil's widow; Savitri's friend; Saachi and Sunny's mother (2017–18)
Neha Bagga as Dr. Pragya Yadav: Saachi and Isha's friend; Satish's fiancé (2017–18)
Sharan Kaur as Dr. Isha Negi: Saachi and Pragya's friend; Manav's love interest (2017–18)
Shabaaz Abdullah Badi as Manav Rai– Isha's patient and lover (2017–18) 
Aneesh Sharma as Dr. Aniket Rastogi: Veer's friend (2017–18)
Mohan Kapoor as Dr. Anand Malhotra: Owner of Savitri Devi College & Hospital; Sumitra's son; Adarsh's elder brother; Sunil's business partner; Savitri and Gayatri's husband; Priya, Veer and Riya's father (2017–18)
Shruti Kanwar as Priya Malhotra Chawla : Savitri and Anand's daughter; Veer's elder sister; Riya's half-sister; Sanket's ex-lover; Vikrant's wife (2017–18)
Yuvraj Malhotra as Vikrant Chawla: Sujeet's son; Priya's husband (2017–18)
Nishigandha Wad as  Savitri Devi: Jaya's friend; Anand's first wife; Priya and Veer's mother (2017–18)
Sonica Handa as Gayatri Raisinghania: Vaidehi's daughter; Anand's second wife; Riya's mother (2017–18)
Akansha Sareen as Dr. Riya Kapoor: Gayatri and Anand's daughter; Priya and Veer's half-sister; Madhu and Bala's friend; Kabir's wife (2017–18)
Meghna Datta as Dr. Madhu Goenka: Riya's friend (2017–18)
Aliya Naaz as Dr. Bala: Riya's friend (2017–18)
Mugdha Chaphekar as  Mishri: Veer's former wife (2018)
Aashish Kaul as Sujeet Chawla: Vikrant's father (2017)
Unknown as Sunil Mishra: Ashok and Suman's elder brother; Anand's business partner; Jaya's husband; Saachi and Sunny's father (2017)
Garv Bajaj as Dr. Garv Singh: Veer's friend (2017–18)
Aakash Talwar as Satish: Pragya's fiancé (2018)
 Alan Kapoor as Sanket Sharma: Priya's ex-lover (2017–18)
Shivaani Sopuri as Sumitra Malhotra: Anand and Adarsh's mother; Priya, Veer and Riya's grandmother (2017–18)
Aparna Ghoshal as Kusum Devi: Kailash's widow; Kabir's mother (2017–18)
Priya Malik as Keerti Fernandes
Amit Dhawan as Adarsh Malhotra: Sumitra's son; Anand's younger brother; Neeta's husband (2017–18)
Kishwer Merchant/Kajal Pisal as Neeta Sachdev: Adarsh's wife (2017–18)
Suchit Vikram Singh as Pratik (2017)
Prerna Panwar as Dr. Ayesha Khurana: Gayatri's accomplice (2018)
Vandana Pathak as Vaidehi Singhania/Padmini: Gayatri's mother; Riya's grandmother (2017–18)
Sushil Bounthiyal as Ashok Mishra: Sunil and Suman's brother; Khushboo's husband (2017–18)
Sudipti Parmar as Khushboo Parmar: Aakash's daughter; Ashok's wife (2017–18)
Unknown as Suman Mishra: Sunil and Ashok's younger sister (2017–18)
Unknown as Aakash Parmar: Khushboo's father (2017–18)
Ahmad Harhash as Sagar Kapoor (2018)
Girish Thapar as Advocate Sadashiv Saxena
Prerit Parpani as child Veer Malhotra (2017–18)

Special appearances 
 Helly Shah as Devanshi from Devanshi
 Rubina Dilaik as Soumya Singh from Shakti - Astitva Ke Ehsaas Ki

Crossover episodes
  Shakti - Astitva Ke Ehsaas Ki on 16 June 2017 — Soumya comes to Savitri Devi Hospital for treatment of a transgender person who is unwell and seeks Saanchi's medical advice on if she can ever be a woman.
  Devanshi on 17 – 19 July 2017 — Devanshi Upadhay  had an accident and she comes to Savitri Devi Hospital. Before this, Saanchi knows Devanshi through phone communications and persuades Devanshi to reveal her true identity.

References

External links
Savitri Devi College & Hospital on Voot

Colors TV original programming
Hindi-language television shows
Indian medical television series
2017 Indian television series debuts
Television shows set in Delhi